Antonio Ozores Puchol (24 August 1928, in Burjassot – 12 May 2010, in Madrid) was a Spanish actor.

He was the son of actors Mariano Ozores and Luisa Puchol, brother of director Mariano Ozores (Jr.) and of actor Jose Luis Ozores, father of Emma Ozores, and uncle of actress Adriana Ozores.

In 1958, he married Elisa Montés (actress and sister of the actresses Emma Penella and Terele Pávez), and was later divorced.

He died on 12 May 2010 at age 81, after a long battle with cancer.

Selected filmography
 El ultimo caballo (1950)
 Sister San Sulpicio (1952)
 Cerca de la ciudad (1952) ... as Cineasta
 Airport (1953)
 The Devil Plays the Flute (1953)
 An Andalusian Gentleman (1954)
 Kubala (1955)
 Blond Arrow (1956)
 The Big Lie (1956)
 We Thieves Are Honourable (1956)
 Familia provisional (1958)
 Los Tramposos (1959) ... as Paco
 Tenemos 18 años (1959) directed by Jesus Franco
 The Daughters of Helena (1963)
 Honeymoon, Italian Style (1966)
Forty Degrees in the Shade (1967) 
 Operation Mata Hari (1968)
 La descarriada (1973) as Nicolás
 Fin de semana al desnudo (1974)
 English Striptease (1975)
 Los Energeticos (1979)
 Las Chicas del bingo (1982)
 Disparte nacional (1990)
 Pelotazo nacional (1993) ... as Candido

References

External links
 

1928 births
2010 deaths
People from Burjassot
Spanish male film actors
Male actors from the Valencian Community
Deaths from cancer in Spain
20th-century Spanish male actors